Xenotrechus is a genus of beetles in the family Carabidae, containing the following species:

 Xenotrechus condei Barr & Krekeler, 1967
 Xenotrechus denticollis Barr & Krekeler, 1967

References

Trechinae